Mazin is a village in Croatia. It is connected by the D218 highway.

Population

According to the 2011 census, Mazin had 47 inhabitants.

1991 census

According to the 1991 census, settlement of Mazin had 362 inhabitants, which were ethnically declared as this:

Austro-hungarian 1910 census

According to the 1910 census, settlement of Mazin had 1,866 inhabitants in 4 hamlets, which were linguistically and religiously declared as this:

Literature 

  Savezni zavod za statistiku i evidenciju FNRJ i SFRJ, popis stanovništva 1948, 1953, 1961, 1971, 1981. i 1991. godine.
 Knjiga: "Narodnosni i vjerski sastav stanovništva Hrvatske, 1880–1991: po naseljima, author: Jakov Gelo, izdavač: Državni zavod za statistiku Republike Hrvatske, 1998., ;

References

External links

Populated places in Zadar County
Lika